Gaan-Ngai also known as "Chakaan Gaan-Ngai" is a festival of the Zeliangrong people of Assam, Manipur and Nagaland states of India. It is the biggest festival out of many festivals observed throughout the indigenous calendar of Rongmei Naga/Kabui tribe.

Relevance 
It is also a post harvest festival. It is mainly performed by the followers and devotees of Zeliangrong Indigenous religion of ‘Poupei Chapriak’(including Tingkao Ragwang Chapriak and other sects) and ‘Heraka’.

Celebration 
Gaan-Ngai is traditionally celebrated in the month of "Gaan-Bu" of the indigenous calendar of the Rongmei Naga tribe which typically falls in the Gregorian month of November or December. So, accordingly, Gaan-Ngai is celebrated in Assam as per the date fixed using the indigenous Rongmei Naga Calendar with the said festival having status of Restricted Holiday in Assam. While in Indian state of Manipur, Gaan-Ngai is celebrated in the 13th day of the Manipuri month of "Wakching" of Meetei Manipuri Calendar with the festival being a State holiday in Manipur.

References

Festivals in Manipur
Festivals in Assam
Festivals in Nagaland
Harvest festivals in India
Religious festivals in India